Roaring Ditch is a tidal waterway approximately 1.6 mi (2.6 km) in length connecting East Creek and Dennis Creek in Cape May County, New Jersey in the United States.

See also
List of rivers of New Jersey

References

Rivers of Cape May County, New Jersey
Rivers of New Jersey
Tributaries of Delaware Bay